Paul Coryn Valentine Marcus (30 May 1954 – 13 February 2011) was a BAFTA winning British television director and producer. His most notable success was as producer of the television series Prime Suspect, but he also worked in cinema, theatre and many other TV series.

Early life
Marcus was born in London in 1954, the son of playwright Frank Marcus, a German-born Jew who fled to Britain in 1939 and the actress Jacqueline Sylvester. He was educated at Latymer Upper School and Lincoln College, Oxford.

Credits
His credits include the following:
 New Voices (1994, TV series)
 Prime Suspect: The Scent of Darkness (1995, TV movie)
 Break Up (1998)
 After Alice (2000)
 Murder Rooms: Mysteries of the Real Sherlock Holmes (2001, TV series)
 The Bill (2002, TV series)
 In Deep (2001 –2003, TV series)
 Imperium: Nerone (2004, TV movie)
 Heidi (2005)
 Dalziel and Pascoe (2000–2006, TV series)
 Roman Mysteries (2007, TV series)
 Lark Rise To Candleford (2009, TV series)

Notes

External links
 
 Obituary in The Independent

1954 births
2011 deaths
Alumni of Lincoln College, Oxford
British television directors
British television producers
Deaths from cancer in England
People educated at Latymer Upper School